Terrance Richard "Terry" Stratton  (born March 16, 1938) is a former Conservative Canadian Senator who represented Manitoba in the Upper House.

A businessman, teacher and consultant, Stratton was appointed to the Senate on the advice of Prime Minister Brian Mulroney in March 1993.

He served as Opposition Whip from 2001 until 2004 when he became Deputy Leader of the Opposition in the Senate. When the Conservatives took power in 2006, he was appointed Government Whip in the Senate, serving until December 31, 2009.

References
 

1938 births
Living people
Canadian senators from Manitoba
Conservative Party of Canada senators
Politicians from Winnipeg
Progressive Conservative Party of Canada senators
21st-century Canadian politicians